Spaceliner may refer to:
 SpaceLiner, a suborbital spaceplane developed by DLR
 Mitsubishi Space Liner car
 Spacecraft in general
 Starship analogs of oceanliners or airliners
 Intercontinental Earth-to-Earth spaceflight that enters outer space on the journey, such as is proposed for the SpaceX BFR spaceship

See also
 Spaceline (disambiguation)
 Starliner (disambiguation)